Daqiao Township is a township of Neixiang County in southwestern Henan province, China, located about  south-southeast of the county seat. , it has 15 villages under its administration.

See also 
 List of township-level divisions of Henan

References 

Township-level divisions of Henan
Neixiang County